Troglodiplura samankunani is a species of troglomorphic spider in the family Anamidae, found in Western Australia, in caves on the Nullarbor Plain.

It was first described in 2020 by Mark Harvey and Michael Rix. The species epithet honours Saman Kunan (a Thai diver, who died during the Tham Luang cave rescue of 2018).

References

Anamidae
Spiders of Australia
Spiders described in 2020